Windsor is a historic plantation complex located near Cascade, Pittsylvania County, Virginia. The house was completed in 1862, and is a two-story, five bay Georgian style brick dwelling, with Italianate style ornamentation.  It has a shallow hipped roof and double-pile, central-hall plan.  The main section is flanked by one-story, one bay wings.  Also on the property are the contributing original school / playhouse, kitchen, smoke house, laundry, gas house, two slave houses, and a spring house, barn / horse stable, Gris Mill.

It was listed on the National Register of Historic Places in 1980.

References

Plantation houses in Virginia
Houses on the National Register of Historic Places in Virginia
Georgian architecture in Virginia
Italianate architecture in Virginia
Houses completed in 1862
Houses in Pittsylvania County, Virginia
National Register of Historic Places in Pittsylvania County, Virginia
1862 establishments in Virginia